The 2012–13 Primera División season was the 25th edition of Spain's highest women's football league. FC Barcelona were the defending champions, having won their 1st title in the previous season. The season played from 2 September 2012, and end on 5 May 2013.

A total of 16 teams contested the league, 14 of which already contested in the 2011–12 season. Sevilla and Levante Las Planas were promoted from the Segunda División last season.

The championship was decided on the last matchday, when Athletic Club Bilbao met Barcelona. After trailing Athletic the whole season, Barcelona overtook them by winning 2–1, and thus defended their title.

Changes from 2011–12
The league was reduced from 18 to 16 teams. Therefore, only two teams will get relegated this year instead of four last season.

Teams

Stadia and locations

Personnel and sponsorship

League table

Results

Match Sporting Huelva–Sevilla was awarded to Sporting by 3–0 due to illegal alignment. The match initially ended 0–0.

See also
 2012–13 Segunda División (women)
 2013 Copa de la Reina de Fútbol

References

External links
Season on soccerway.com
Season on marca.com

2012-13
Spa
1
women's